Enderta may refer to:

 Enderta province, a historic subdivision of Ethiopia
 Enderta (woreda), a woreda within the Tigray Region of Ethiopia